Jules Théophile Schuler (18 June 1821 – 26 January 1878) was a French painter and illustrator in the Romantic style. He gave his name to an art award established in 1938.

Life 
The son of a pastor, he studied painting in his hometown, intaglio printmaking in Karlsruhe and finally took further lessons in the studios of Michel Martin Drolling and Paul Delaroche in Paris between 1839 and 1843. After 1848, he settled in Strasbourg where he painted, illustrated and gave drawing courses. From 1859 onwards, he collaborated with the publisher Pierre-Jules Hetzel, for whom he illustrated works by Verne (Master Zacharius), Hugo (Les Châtiments) and Erckmann-Chatrian, but also an alphabet for children, to which a letter "W" was added when it appeared in an American edition as Letters Everywhere: Stories And Rhymes For Children, and the children's classic Hans Brinker, or The Silver Skates.

Schuler's masterpiece is the monumental oil on canvas painting The Chariot of Death, created in a spirit of mystical despair after the French Revolution of 1848 and similar simultaneous events in Europe. It is prominently displayed in the Unterlinden Museum of Colmar, to which it was given by the artist in 1862.

In his mature years in Strasbourg, Schuler lived in a Renaissance house on 1, quai Saint-Nicolas. He is commemorated by a relief portrait below the oriel window. Since 1918, a street in Strasbourg bears his name (rue Théophile Schuler).

Prize 
The Prix Théophile Schuler is awarded every year to up and coming local artists under the age of 35 by the Société des Amis des Arts et des Musées de Strasbourg ("Society of the friends of the arts and of the museums of Strasbourg"), founded in 1832, of which Schuler was a general secretary. It was established in 1938 thanks to a legacy by Schuler's daughter Alsa; in 2016, the prize amount was 3,000 Euros.

Gallery

See also

 List of European art awards

References

External links

Painters from Alsace
Artists from Strasbourg
1821 births
1878 deaths
19th-century French painters
French illustrators
French male painters
19th-century French male artists